Dinis was the sixth King of Portugal and the Algarve.

Dinis may also refer to:

 Dinis (given name), a Portuguese masculine given name
 Dinis (surname), a surname

See also
 Dini (disambiguation)